Karen Barritza (born Barbat, 3 July 1992) is a Danish former tennis player.

She has won seven singles and seven doubles titles on the ITF Circuit. On 17 April 2017, she reached her best singles of world No. 396. On 16 July 2012, she peaked at No. 362 in the WTA doubles rankings.

Barritza made her WTA Tour main-draw debut at the 2010 Danish Open in the doubles event, partnering Mai Grage.

Playing for Denmark Fed Cup team, she has a win–loss record of 18–21.

ITF Circuit finals

Singles: 13 (7 titles, 6 runner-ups)

Doubles: 12 (7 titles, 5 runner-ups)

References

External links

 
 
 

1992 births
Living people
Sportspeople from Aalborg
Danish female tennis players
21st-century Danish women